The Force de frappe (French: "strike force"), or Force de dissuasion ("deterrent force") after 1961, is the French nuclear deterrent force. The Force de dissuasion used to be a triad of air-, sea- and land-based nuclear weapons intended for dissuasion, the French term for deterrence. France has deactivated its land-based missiles and today the Force de dissuasion incorporates both an air and sea component. 

The French Nuclear Force, part of the French military, is the fourth largest nuclear-weapons force in the world, after the nuclear triad of the United States, the Russian Federation and the People's Republic of China.

On 27 January 1996, France conducted its last nuclear test in the South Pacific and then signed the Comprehensive Nuclear-Test-Ban Treaty (CTBT) in September 1996. In March 2008, French President Nicolas Sarkozy confirmed reports giving the actual size of France's nuclear arsenal and he announced that France would reduce its French Air Force-carried nuclear arsenal by 30%, leaving the Force de Frappe with 290 warheads.

In addition to its nuclear military programme, France has a large peaceful nuclear programme and ranks as one of the world's largest generators of nuclear power.

History 

The decision to arm France with nuclear weapons was made in 1954 by the administration of Pierre Mendès-France under the Fourth Republic. President Charles de Gaulle, upon his return to power in 1958, solidified the initial vision into the well-defined concept of a fully independent Force de Frappe that would be capable of protecting France from a Soviet or other foreign attack and independent of the North Atlantic Treaty Organization, which de Gaulle considered to be too dominated by the United States. In particular, France was concerned that in the event of a Soviet invasion of Western Europe, the US, already bogged down in the Vietnam War and afraid of Soviet retaliation against the United States, would not come to the aid of its allies in Western Europe. De Gaulle felt that France should never entrust its defense and therefore its very existence to a foreign-and thus unreliable-protector.

The strategic concept behind the Force de Frappe is one of countervalue, the capacity to inflict so much damage on a potential (and more powerful) adversary's population that the potential adversary will be deterred from attacking, no matter how much destruction it can inflict (mutual assured destruction).  This principle is usually referred to in French political debate as dissuasion du faible au fort ("deterrence from the weak to the strong") and was summarized in a statement attributed to de Gaulle himself:

{{quote|Within ten years, we shall have the means to kill 80 million Russians. I truly believe that one does not light-heartedly attack people who are able to kill 80 million Russians, even if one can kill 800 million French, that is if there were 800 million French.<ref>Serge Gadal, (2009). Forces aériennes stratégiques: histoire des deux premières composantes de la dissuasion nucléaire française. Economica. p.86. . Quote: "Dans dix ans, nous aurons de quoi tuer 80 millions de Russes. Eh bien je crois qu'on n'attaque pas volontiers des gens qui ont de quoi tuer 80 millions de Russes, même si on a soi-même de quoi tuer 800 millions de Français, à supposer qu'il y eût 800 millions de Français." </ref>
}}

General Pierre Marie Gallois said, "Making the most pessimistic assumptions, the French nuclear bombers could destroy ten Russian cities; and France is not a prize worthy of ten Russian cities".

In his book La paix nucléaire (1975), French Navy Admiral Marc de Joybert explained deterrence:

While not referred to as such, the French nuclear posture of the time bears some significant similarities to other common policies of the era such as mutually assured destruction and massive retaliation. It remains unknown whether the French government ever seriously considered its policy different from other NATO member strategies or if their public statements were more aimed to improve morale and confidence in the French population.

It may seem that on the surface, an avowed policy of attacking civilians was a significant departure from the typical nuclear policies of the time, but it was common for states to refer to their nuclear abilities in terms of numbers of cities destroyed, and the power of hydrogen bombs makes it unclear how different attacks on populations and military forces would be. Perhaps the most significant difference in French strategy is that it includes the option of a first strike attack, even in response to non-nuclear provocation.

France carried out its first test of an atomic bomb in Algeria in 1960 and some operational French nuclear weapons became available in 1964. Then, France executed its first test of the much more powerful hydrogen bomb over its South Pacific Ocean test range in 1968.

De Gaulle's vision of the Force de Frappe featured the same triad of air-based, land-based and sea-based weapons that were deployed by both the United States and the Soviet Union. Work on the components had started in the late 1950s and was accelerated as soon as de Gaulle became the president.

 Air 
Initially, the Force de Frappe had an airbase component of the Strategic Air Forces Command (Commandement des Forces Aeriennes Strategique (CFAS)) of the French Air Force, established in 1955 and operating 40 Sud Aviation Vautour IIB bombers. They were considered marginal for a strategic bomber role, and work began almost immediately on a replacement resulting in the Mirage III.

In May 1956, a requirement for what became the Dassault Mirage IV bomber was drawn up; the bomber was designed to carry AN-11 nuclear gravity bombs over targets in the Eastern bloc at supersonic speeds and was declared operational in October 1964. It has since been modernized and converted to carry its successor, the AN-22 bomb. The Mirage IV-P version was later armed with the ASMP missile and entered service in 1986. All bomber versions of the Mirage IV retired in 1996.

From 1973 to 2003, the CFAS also operated SEPECAT Jaguars, limited nuclear capable of using the tactical AN-52 nuclear bomb, which were certified for supersonic flight. A total of 100 were built in 1972 to 1982. They were compatible with modified Mirage III fighters and later with the standard Jaguar. The Mirage 2000 was theorically capable of carrying it but never did so. The AN-52's were deactivated and placed into storage in 1991.

The Mirage 2000N entered service in 1988 and can carry gravity bombs, the ASMP and the new longer-ranged ASMP-A missile, which entered service 2009. The Mirage 2000N was being replaced by the Dassault Rafale F3 as of 2011.

 Land 

The land-based component of the French nuclear triad was added in August 1971, when 18 silo-based S2 medium-range ballistic missiles, which achieved operational readiness at French Air Force Aerial Base 200 Saint Christol Albion, in Vaucluse, southern France. Later, the land-based component was augmented with the mobile shortrange Pluton missile and Hadès missile, which were designed to be launched from the front lines at any approaching foreign army. To defend against a Soviet-Warsaw Pact invasion of West Germany, they could be deployed with the French Army in the French Zone of Germany, in Western Germany.

Since the French military judged a full-scale invasion of Western Europe by the Soviet Union and its Warsaw Pact Allies to be unlikely to be stopped by conventional armaments, the short-range nuclear missiles were meant as a "final warning" (ultime avertissement in French), which would tell the aggressor that any further advances would trigger a nuclear armageddon upon its major cities and other important targets.

The Pluton missile, introduced in 1974, was retired from service and scrapped beginning in 1993, and its successor, the Hadès missile, was produced in limited numbers during the early 1990s and then withdrawn from the army and placed in arsenal storage in 1995. Next, the French government decided to eliminate all of those missiles, and the last Hadès was dismantled on 23 June 1997. That was the end of the French mobile land-based nuclear missiles.

The French fixed S3 IRBMs at the Plateau d'Albion, which were considered to be approaching obsolescence and also deemed to be no longer necessary following the fall of the Soviet Union and so also were disposed of. The silos have been imploded and the missile base closed in 1999, eliminating the landbased missile leg of the French nuclear triad.

 Sea 
The ocean-based, mobile component of the French nuclear triad entered service in December 1971, with the commissioning of its first ballistic missile submarine, the nuclear submarine Le Redoutable, which initially carried 16 M1 intermediate-range ballistic missiles, similar to the former US Polaris missiles.

Since then, the ocean-based French nuclear weapons arsenal has been expanded to a squadron of four submarines, one of which is always on patrol. Since 1985, some of the French ballistic missile subs have become obsolete. The subs have been retired and replaced by newer subs that also have 16 missile tubes apiece and carry the more advanced French M45 missile. A new submarine, the Le Terrible, was put into service on 20 September 2010, armed with the M51 missile, which is similar to the US Trident II.

The Aeronavale or French Naval Aviation has operated a fleet of nuclear-armed aircraft since 1962, with the Dassault Etendard IV on its Clemenceau-class aircraft carriers. The Etendard could be armed with AN-52 nuclear gravity bombs. In 1978, the Dassault Super Etendard entered service, giving the Aeronavale a stand-off nuclear strike ability via its Air-Sol Moyenne Portée (ASMP) nuclear missiles. As the Clemenceau class retired from 1997 to 2000, the Super Etendard remained in service on the succeeding R91 Charles-de-Gaulle. Since 2010 it carries Rafale F3 fighters armed with the upgraded ASMP-A nuclear missiles.

 Components 

 Land-based component 
France no longer possesses land-based nuclear missiles. The IRBM base aérienne 200 Apt-Saint-Christol at the Plateau d'Albion, (Vaucluse) was deactivated in 1996 and its missiles scrapped. All French Army units equipped with short-range missiles such as the Pluton and the Hadès were disbanded, their missiles scrapped and their fissile nuclear materials recycled.

 Sea-based component 

The French Navy includes a nuclear strategic branch, the Force Océanique Stratégique, which has contained as many as 6 nuclear-powered ballistic missile submarines in service at one time. Up to 2022, the ten SSBNs built for the French Navy are:
 6 Redoutable class submarines, armed with 16 M4 IRBMs entered service between 1971 and 1985. The last of these, L'Inflexible (S 615), was retired from service in 2008.
 Le Terrible (S 619) commissioned in 2010, armed with 16 of the more modern M51 missile, successfully tested in 2010.
 3 Triomphant-class SSBNs: Le Triomphant (S 616), Le Téméraire (S 617), Le Vigilant (S 618), armed with 16 of the less modern M45 missile. They will be upgraded to the new M51 missile by 2018, Le Vigilant will be the first to be upgraded, starting in 2011.

 Air-based component 

The Armée de l'air et de l'espace has 75 ASMP medium-range air-to-ground missiles with nuclear warheads at its disposal, of which:
 Appx 50 could arm the Air Force to be carried by Mirage 2000N long-range multirole fighters. Strike detachments of these aircraft are based at Luxeuil - Saint-Sauveur Air Base, Istres Air Base and Avord Air Base. Since 1 July 2010, a new squadron of Rafale N (N for Nuclear) has been declared fully operational as Escadron de Chasse 1/91 Gascogne in Saint-Dizier – Robinson Air Base (BA 113).
 About 15 more could be armed by the Aviation navale to be carried by the French Navy's Rafale (M version, for Marine). These aircraft are landbased at Landivisiau Naval Air Base and on the aircraft carrier Charles de Gaulle when at sea. Thus they can be operated flexibly. The Rafale M is also certified to operate from United States Navy aircraft carriers.
 10 ASMP's are permanently in overhaul and form the reserve.

The locations of the nuclear missiles are secret (although many storage facilities are already known to the public, the number of warheads inside is classified and changes frequently).  The range of strike aircraft is extended currently by the KC-135 and in the future by the forthcoming Airbus A330 MRTT aerial refueling fleet.

 Nuclear ordnance security Gendarmerie 

The Nuclear ordnance security Gendarmerie (French: Gendarmerie de la sécurité des armements nucléaires GSAN) was created in 1964 and is one of the five specialized branches of the French Gendarmerie. It is placed under the supervision the Ministry of Armed Forces and plays a major role in the security chain of the nuclear devices.

The main mission of this specific branch is to secure the government's control over all the nuclear forces and weapons.

More specifically, the gendarmes of this unit are responsible for ensuring the protection and the readiness of the different kinds of missiles used by the French Navy and Air Force.

In order to do so, the GSAN is composed of its own units and of units from other branches of the gendarmerie, temporarily placed under its command like squadrons of the Mobile Gendarmerie to protect the convoys of nuclear weapons components.

 Jupiter Command Post 
The Jupiter Command Post is a structure in the bunker of the Élysée Palace. It is equipped with means of communication and protection to enable the French president and his advisers to manage crisis situations and to be in contact at all times with other government entities, military command posts and foreign governments. The bunker was built for President Albert Lebrun in 1940 during the Phoney War, and President Valéry Giscard d'Estaing installed its command post in 1978.

 See also 
 France and weapons of mass destruction (includes more detailed discussion of nuclear testing)
 List of states with nuclear weapons
 List of nuclear weapons tests
 Foreign policy of Charles de Gaulle
 Nuclear weapon
 Gaullism

 References 

 Bibliography 
  Jean-Hugues Oppel, Réveillez le président !'', Éditions Payot et rivages, 2007. The book is a fiction about the nuclear weapons of France; the book also contains about ten chapters on true historical incidents involving nuclear weapons and strategy  (during the second half of the twentieth century).

Deterrence theory during the Cold War
 
Nuclear history of France
Strategic forces